This article contains the results of the Republic of Ireland national football team during the 2010s.

2010

2011

2012

2013

2014

2015

2016

2017

2018

2019

References

External links
 Republic of Ireland official website
 Republic of Ireland on FIFA.com

2010-19
2010 in Republic of Ireland association football
2011 in Republic of Ireland association football
2012 in Republic of Ireland association football
2013 in Republic of Ireland association football
2014 in Republic of Ireland association football
2015 in Republic of Ireland association football
2016 in Republic of Ireland association football
2017 in Republic of Ireland association football